Chimarra abacensis is a species of fingernet caddisfly in the family Philopotamidae.

References 

Trichoptera
Insects described in 2012